D. exigua may refer to:

 Dalea exigua, a prairie clover
 Delia exigua, a calyptrate muscoid
 Dolichoctis exigua, a ground beetle
 Drimia exigua, a flowering plant